Lala is an Albanian surname. Notable people with this surname include:

 Afzal Khan Lala (1926–2015), Pakistani politician and Pashtun nationalist
 Altin Lala (born 1975), Albanian footballer
 Fatos Lala (born 1995), Albanian footballer
 Gëzim Lala (born 1956), Albanian footballer
 Karim Lala (1911–2002), Afghani-born founder of the Indian mafia
 Kenny Lala (born 1991), French footballer
 Kevin Neville Lala (born 1962), English evolutionary biologist
 Joe Lala (1947–2014), American actor and musician
 Leonardo Lala (1906–2000), Italian writer, historian and folklorist 
 Mahran Lala (born 1982), Israeli-Druze footballer
 Rauf Lala (born 1970), Pakistani comedian, actor, writer and producer

See also 
 Adriatik Llalla (born 1969), Albanian Prosecutor General of the Republic of Albania
Lalas, surname

Albanian-language surnames